John Paul Flynn (born August 30, 1993) is an American football offensive lineman who is currently a free agent. He played college football at Montana State.

College career
Flynn started in 43 consecutive games for Montana State. Flynn earned All-Big Sky first-team awards in 2014 and 2016. In 2013 Flynn earned All-Big Sky third-team award.

Professional career
Flynn went undrafted in the 2017 NFL Draft. On May 4, 2017, Flynn was signed by the San Francisco 49ers. 

Flynn was waived on September 2, 2017 but was re-signed the next day to the 49ers' practice squad. On November 13, 2017, Flynn was placed on practice squad injured reserve. 

On July 26, 2018, Flynn signed a two-year contract with the 49ers. On August 31, 2018, Flynn was waived/injured but reverted to the team's injured reserve for the second year in a row on September 1, 2018. He was released on January 5, 2019.

References

External links

1993 births
Living people
People from Knoxville, Tennessee
American football centers
Montana State Bobcats football players
San Francisco 49ers players
Bettendorf High School alumni